Clinical Neurology and Neurosurgery is a quarterly peer-reviewed medical journal covering neurology and neurosurgery. It was established in 1974 and is published by Elsevier. The editor-in-chief is Peter Paul De Deyn (University of Antwerp). According to the Journal Citation Reports, the journal has a 2021 impact factor of 1.885.

References

External links

Neurology journals
Neurosurgery journals
Elsevier academic journals
Publications established in 1974
Quarterly journals
English-language journals